Cincinnati Work House and Hospital was a registered historic building in the neighborhood of Camp Washington, Cincinnati, Ohio, listed in the National Register on March 3, 1980.

The City Work House was located on Colerain Avenue upon the grounds of old Camp Washington, used for the rendezvous of Ohio troops during the Mexican War. The buildings were about 510 feet in length, five stories high and from 54 to 60 feet in width. They were designed by Adams and Hannaford and built under the direction of Robert Allison, chairman of the building committee of the Council in the years 1866 to 1890 at the cost of about half a million dollars. In a 1904 report, it had 606 cells and received between about 2,500 and 3,000 prisoners each year.

Prisoners were moved out of the building in the late 1980s and the building was demolished in 1990. Today the site is home to another correctional facility called River City Correctional Center, which treats felons for chemical dependency.

The 1989 film Lock Up starring Sylvester Stallone was shot at the City Work House.

Several artifacts taken from the Work House, including the door of a jail cell and the old prison register, are on display at the Hamilton County Justice Center.

Notes

External links
1875 report on the Work House
Documentation from the University of Cincinnati

National Register of Historic Places in Cincinnati
Buildings and structures in Cincinnati
Buildings and structures demolished in 1991
Hospitals in Cincinnati
Defunct prisons in Ohio
Hospital buildings on the National Register of Historic Places in Ohio
1869 establishments in Ohio
1991 disestablishments in Ohio